Kikojevac is a village situated in Knić municipality in Serbia.

References

Populated places in Šumadija District